= List of state police minimum age requirements in the US =

This is a List of State Police Minimum Age Requirements in the United States.

Many states have established, by state statute and/or constitutional provisions, minimum age requirements for the primary law enforcement agency of the state.

== 18 years old ==
Rhode Island

Wisconsin

Louisiana

Montana

Texas

West Virginia

== 19 years old ==
Florida Alabama

== 19 1/2 for Trooper Cadet, 21 years old for Trooper ==
Washington

== 21 years old ==
Alaska Arkansas Idaho Indiana Kansas Kentucky Massachusetts Minnesota Mississippi Nevada New Hampshire New Jersey New York North Carolina Oklahoma Oregon South Carolina Tennessee Utah California Illinois Maryland Vermont

== 21, 20 with 60 College Credits ==
Maine

== 20, 21 at graduation ==
Alaska Arizona Hawai’i Colorado Delaware Georgia Michigan Missouri Nebraska New Mexico North Dakota Ohio Pennsylvania South Dakota Virginia

== 21, 22 at graduation ==
Iowa Wyoming
